In music, Op. 68 stands for Opus number 68. Compositions that are assigned this number include:

 Arnold – Sweeney Todd
 Beethoven – Symphony No. 6
 Brahms – Symphony No. 1
 Britten – Cello Symphony
 Chopin – Mazurkas, Op. 68
 Dvořák – Silent Woods
 Elgar – Falstaff
 Fučík – Entrance of the Gladiators
 Mendelssohn – Festgesang an die Künstler
 Sallinen – Palatsi
 Schumann – Album for the Young
 Scriabin – Piano Sonata No. 9
 Shostakovich – String Quartet No. 2
 Spohr – String Quartet No. 19
 Strauss – Sechs Lieder, Op. 68